Alex Auswaks was a Jerusalem-based writer of crime fiction. He was born in Tientsin, China on 6 February 1934. Though his work is primarily in shorter crime fiction, his novel  "A Trick of Diamonds" was featured by Collins Crime Club in 1981. The book was shortlisted that year for the 'British Crime Writers Association 'John Creasy Award' in the 'Debut Dagger' category.

From 1990 to 1995, Auswaks edited and wrote for the publication of the 'Tientsin Society', for the community of  Russian-exiled Jews who lived in that Chinese city during the Second World War.

Between 1989 and 1995, Auswaks contributed a weekly column reviewing crime fiction to The Jerusalem Post

His articles on the Russian poet Osip Mandelstam and on the Israeli detective-fiction writer Batya Gur appear in Jewish Writers of the Twentieth Century (Routledge 2003).

He died in Jerusalem on 7 April 2013, and is buried in Givat Shaul Cemetery.

References

 Auswaks, Alex; Contents article on David Williams' Mark's Treasure
 Auswaks, Alex; Trick of Diamonds, Collins Crime Club  London 2003
 Jakubowski, Maxim (ed.); 100 Great Detectives, Carroll & Graf, New York, 1991. 
 Kerbel, Sorrewll (ed.); Jewish Writers of the Twentieth Century, Routledge London 2003 695 pp.

1934 births
2013 deaths
Crime fiction writers
Chinese emigrants to Israel